The 2012 Middle Tennessee Blue Raiders football team represented Middle Tennessee State University as a member of Sun Belt Conference during the 2012 NCAA Division I FBS football season. Led by seventh-year head coach Rick Stockstill, the Blue Raiders compiled an overall record of 8–4 with a mark of 6–2 in conference play, placing in a three-way tie for second in the Sun Belt. Despite finishing two wins above bowl eligibility, the Middle Tennessee was not invited to a bowl game.

The 2012 season was the Blue Raiders in the Sun Belt. Middle Tennessee initially announced a move to Conference USA (C-USA) to take effect no later than July 2014 and later moved the conference change up to July 2013.

During the offseason
Tyrone Nix was named co-defensive coordinator, along with Steve Ellis, and linebackers coach on February 22, 2012. Nix has led nationally ranked defenses at Southern Miss, South Carolina, and Ole Miss. Interim offensive coordinator, Buster Faulkner, was named offensive coordinator in February 2012.  During the 2011 season Faulkner took over the play-calling duties the final seven games of the year following the resignation of Willie Simmons. Faulkner’s 2011 offense went on to record the fifth most yards of total offense, complete a record 299 passes, while becoming just the second offense in school history to amass over 3,000 passing yards.

Schedule

Game summaries

McNeese State

Florida Atlantic

@ Memphis

@ Georgia Tech

Louisiana–Monroe

@ FIU

@ Mississippi State

North Texas

@ WKU

@ South Alabama

Troy

@ Arkansas State

References

Middle Tennessee
Middle Tennessee Blue Raiders football seasons
Middle Tennessee Blue Raiders football